Renzie Ongkiko (born July 22, 1988, in Mandaluyong, Philippines), better known for his stage name Renz Ongkiko is a Filipino newscaster, media personality and model. Renz is currently seen on News5 as a media personality and news anchor

Biography 
Lorenzo Ongkiko was born and raised in Mandaluyong, Philippines on July 22, 1988. Completed his high school in Diliman Preparatory School in Quezon City and pursued a college degree in Mass Media at De La Salle University.

He is widely known as a news broadcaster in AksyonTV on TV5.

See also 
 Paolo Bediones
 Hermes Bautista
 Mark Luz

References 

1988 births
Living people
Filipino television journalists
News5 people
Filipino male models
De La Salle University alumni
People from Mandaluyong
Tagalog people